Ape Escape, known in Japan as , is a series of computer-generated anime shorts produced by Shogakukan Music & Digital Entertainment and Sony Computer Entertainment for TV Tokyo in 2002. It is based on the Ape Escape video game series, with the characters and designs based on Ape Escape 2 in particular. The series consists of 76 45-second shorts that aired as part of the Oha Suta variety program in Japan. In 2004, three of these shorts were dubbed into English and aired in the inaugural Nicktoons Film Festival. One of the festival's founders, Frederator Studios, would later produce their own series of Ape Escape shorts in 2009.

A 22-minute movie based on the series, entitled , was released on August 17, 2002, in Japan. The film was attached to Beyblade: Fierce Battle and produced with assistance by Polygon Pictures.

Sony Computer Entertainment released a DVD featuring the entire series of shorts, as well as the movie on December 19, 2002, in Japan. The DVD came with a "Yappari Saru Get Chu" dance instruction video, and an exclusive Afrosaru trading card.

References

External links

 Shogakukan Production Page (Japanese)
 Movie Trailer (Youtube)

2002 anime television series debuts
Ape Escape
Japanese children's animated action television series
Japanese children's animated adventure television series
Japanese children's animated comedy television series
Anime television series based on video games
Japanese animated films
Works based on Sony Interactive Entertainment video games